Minor Empire are a Turkish-Canadian progressive music group formed in 2010 in Toronto, Ontario, which has been noted for its mixture of psychedelic rock and Turkish music.

History 
Minor Empire was founded in 2010 by guitarist/composer/producer Ozan Boz and singer Ozgu Ozman. Their debut album Second Nature was released in January 2011. Exclaim! magazine called the album "successfully dreamy", and another reviewer called it "bold, expertly worked and voluptuous". Minor Empire made Alevi Turkish folk song covers. Minor Empire won the award for World Group of the Year at the 2011 Canadian Folk Music Awards, and he award for World Artist/Group of the Year at the 2012 Canadian Independent Music Awards.

Their second album Uprooted was released in 2017. The Arts Fuse listed Uprooted as one of its favorite releases of the year. Minor Empire was nominated at the Canadian Folk Music Awards and Independent Music Awards again in 2018.

Discography
Second Nature (2011)
Uprooted (2017)

References

External links
 Minor Empire Official website

Musical groups established in 2010
Musical groups from Toronto
Canadian world music groups
2010 establishments in Ontario
Canadian Folk Music Award winners
Turkish culture
Turkish music
Turkish musical groups